Georgios Marantas (born 5 August 1973) is a Greek football manager.

References

1973 births
Living people
Greek football managers
PAS Lamia 1964 managers
Makedonikos F.C. managers
Panachaiki F.C. managers
Kavala F.C. managers
Fokikos F.C. managers
Panelefsiniakos F.C. managers
Panegialios F.C. managers
Trikala F.C. managers
Acharnaikos F.C. managers
Expatriate football managers in Albania
Greek expatriate sportspeople in Albania
People from Xanthi (regional unit)
Sportspeople from Eastern Macedonia and Thrace